Patten is an Irish and British surname.

Origins

Ó Peatáin is now anglicised as Patton in Ulster, and Patten in north Connacht. Ó Peatáin "were a branch of Cenél nEógain in Donegal", with some seemingly dispersed into Connacht as a result of the Ulster Plantations. "Many Pattons in Ulster are of Scottish or English origin", arriving in Ulster during the 1600s with the plantations .

Notable people
Alice Patten, English actress, daughter of Chris Patten, Baron Patten of Barnes
Anna Patten (born 1999), English footballer
Arthur B. Patten, American clergyman and author of books, hymn texts and poems
Azel W. Patten (1828–1902), American businessman and politician
Barry Patten (1927–2003), Australian Olympic alpine skier and architect
Bebe Patten (1913–2004), Christian evangelist, founder of Patten University (see below)
Casey Patten (1874–1935), professional baseball pitcher
Cassie Patten (born 1987), British freestyle swimmer
Charles Joseph Patten (1870–1948), Irish anatomist and ornithologist
Chris Patten, Baron Patten of Barnes (born 1944), British Tory politician, last British Governor of Hong Kong
David Patten (1974–2021), National Football League wide receiver
David W. Patten (1799–1838), early leader and martyr of the Latter Day Saint movement
Edward J. Patten (1905–1994), American Congressman and lawyer
Eric Patten (1924–2013), resident of Toodyay, Western Australia
Fred Patten (1940–2018), American author and historian
Gilbert Patten (1866–1945), writer of dime novels, particularly the Frank Merriwell stories
Harold Patten (1907–1969), American member of the House of Representatives from Arizona
J. Patten, English footballer who played for Southampton F.C. in 1907
Jack Patten (1904–1957), Australian Aboriginal activist and journalist
Joel Patten (born 1958), National Football League tackle
John Patten (disambiguation), list of people with the name
Joseph Patten (1710–1787), politician in Nova Scotia
Luke Patten (born 1980), Australian rugby league player
Marguerite Patten (1915–2015), English home economist, food writer and broadcaster
Mark Patten (1902–1996), Scottish cricketer
Matt Patten (born 1977), American member of the Ohio House of Representatives
Nicholas Patten (born 1950), English judge
Richard Patten (1942–2021), Canadian politician
Robert Patten (disambiguation), list of people with the name
Simon Patten (1852–1922), American economist
Thelma Patten Law (1900–1968), African American physician
Thomas G. Patten (1861–1939), American member of the House of Representatives from New York
Wes Patten (born 1974), Australian rugby league footballer
William Waynflete ( – 1486), born William Patten, Lord Chancellor of England and Bishop of Winchester
Zeboim Cartter Patten (1840–1925), American industrialist

References

Surnames of Irish origin
Surnames of English origin
Scottish surnames